Brawner Creek is a stream in Jefferson County, Nebraska, in the United States.
Brawner Creek was named for a pioneer settler.

See also
List of rivers of Nebraska

References

Rivers of Jefferson County, Nebraska
Rivers of Nebraska